David Cook may refer to:

Entertainment
 David Cook (game designer) (active since 1980s), American game designer for TSR
 David Cook (singer) (born 1982), winner of the seventh season of American Idol
 David Cook (writer) (1940–2015), British novelist, screenwriter, and TV presenter
 David Essex (David Albert Cook, born 1947), British pop and rock singer
 David L. Cook (born 1968), American Christian singer and comedian

Politics
 David Cook (Arizona politician) (active since 2016), member of the Arizona House of Representatives
 David Cook (Arkansas politician) (born 1950), member of the Arkansas House of Representatives
 David Cook (Northern Ireland politician) (1944–2020), politician of the Alliance Party of Northern Ireland
 David Cook (Texas politician) (born 1971), member of the Texas House of Representatives and former mayor of Mansfield, Texas
 Dave Cook (politician) (1941–1993), British communist politician and climber

Sports
 David Cook (cricketer) (born 1936), former English cricketer
 David Cook (cyclist) (born 1969), British Olympic cyclist
 David Cook (racing driver) (born 1975), British former racing driver

Other people
 David Cook (artist) Found object artist in Minneapolis and Chicago
 David Cook (Blockbuster founder) (active since 1978), American businessman
 David Cook (historian) (active since 2003), American professor, and historian of Islam at Rice University
 David Cook (literary critic) (1929–2003), British professor of East African literature
 David C. Cook (1875–2016), a nonprofit Christian publisher in Colorado Springs, Colorado
 David J. Cook (1840/2–1907), Old West detective and marshal
 E. David Cook (21st century), American religion professor at Wheaton College

Other uses
 David Cook (album), a 2008 album by David Cook

See also
David Cooke (disambiguation)